A reductase is an enzyme that catalyzes a reduction reaction.

Examples
 5α-Reductase
 5β-Reductase
 Dihydrofolate reductase
 HMG-CoA reductase
 Methemoglobin reductase
 Ribonucleotide reductase
 Thioredoxin reductase
 E. coli nitroreductase
 Methylenetetrahydrofolate reductase

See also
 Oxidase
 Oxidoreductase

References

Oxidoreductases